Harry Williamson may refer to:

 Harry Williamson (athlete) (1913–2000), American middle-distance runner
 Harry Williamson (musician) (born 1950), British musician, member of Ant-Bee
 Harry Albro Williamson (1875–1965), American Freemasonry historian
 H. H. Williamson (1916–1972), Canadian prospector and politician

See also
 Henry Williamson (1895–1977), British author